Jill Rappaport (born September 27, 1956) is an American journalist, animal advocate, and author. She has reported for The Today Show for over 22-years as well as NBC Nightly News and NBC affiliates. She was the creator, host, and executive producer of the animal welfare program, "Best in Shelter with Jill Rappaport," for NBC. She hosts the "Dog Bowl," and "Puppy Bowl," a dog rescue and adoption program on Animal Planet.

Bibliography 
 Jack Jill: The Miracle Dog with a Happy Tail to Tell, Collins, 2009, 
 500 Cats, HarperCollins, 2009, 
 Mazel Tov: Celebrities' Bat Mitzvah Memories, Simon & Schuster, 2007, 
 People We Know, Horses They Love, Rodale Books, 2004,

References

External links

1964 births
Living people
American women television journalists
People associated with animal welfare and rights
People from Jericho, New York
20th-century American journalists
20th-century American women
21st-century American women